El Peñol is a town and municipality in Antioquia Department, Colombia. Part of the subregion of Eastern Antioquia. The town is nationally known for its monolith known also as El Peñol which is a tourist attraction.

References

Municipalities of Antioquia Department